John Joseph McGuire III (born August 24, 1968) is a member of the Virginia House of Delegates. He was first elected in 2017, and represents the 56th district comprising areas to the North and West of Richmond, Virginia.

McGuire is a former United States Navy SEAL. Overcoming severe injuries, McGuire founded a physical training business, SEAL Team Physical Training, that has been employed by Virginia Commonwealth University sports teams.

Political career

In 2017, McGuire ran for the Virginia House of Delegates for the 56th district, then held by retiring Republican incumbent Peter Farrell. He told the Richmond Times-Dispatch that his main motivation for running was "interested in growing businesses in Virginia and wants to continue providing support for veterans and law enforcement officers."

McGuire won a hotly contested June 2017 Republican primary with 31% of the vote, defeating five other candidates. McGuire won the endorsement of Virginia Right! Blog, which noted he "came back from a horrible accident to walk and live a decent life again," as well as his Navy service and conservative views. McGuire was attacked for allegedly moving into the 56th district for the race, although this was disputed by McGuire and supporters. McGuire nevertheless prevailed.

In the general election, McGuire defeated health care consultant Melissa Dart by a 59% to 40% margin, despite a fundraising disadvantage, the Democrats' huge 2017 statewide gains, and Hillary Clinton's 2016 victory among district voters.

In October 2019, while campaigning for re-election, McGuire declined to commit to completing his second term in office, responding to widespread speculation that he was considering a congressional campaign. After winning re-election in November, McGuire announced his candidacy for U.S. Congress for Virginia's 7th congressional district.  McGuire lost a closely contested convention to Nick Freitas who went on to lose to Abigail Spanberger in the 2020 election.

McGuire faced criticism for his presence in Washington, D.C. on January 6, 2021. While acknowledging media reports that he had been present at the pro-Trump rally outside of the Capitol Building, McGuire denied participating in the subsequent attack on the United States Capitol.

Legislative bills and positions

McGuire spent his first two years with Republicans holding a narrow majority in the House of Delegates.  His bill to put veterans' ID on Virginia drivers' licenses won approval and was signed into law. Running for re-election in 2019, McGuire cited "giving teachers a 5% pay raise without raising your taxes while balancing the budget" as the key legislative achievement of his first two years, and "Jobs, the opioid crisis, and education" as the three top issues facing the next general Assembly.

McGuire publicly opposed Virginia's ratification of the Equal Rights Amendment, pointing out that the resolution had missed the deadline for ratification.

See also
 2020 VCDL Lobby Day

References

External links
John McGuire at the Virginia Public Access Project

1968 births
21st-century American politicians
Protesters in or near the January 6 United States Capitol attack
Living people
Republican Party members of the Virginia House of Delegates
People from Goochland County, Virginia
People from Henrico County, Virginia
People from Richmond, Virginia
United States Navy SEALs personnel
Henrico High School alumni